Acalolepta montana is a species of beetle in the family Cerambycidae. It was described by Per Olof Christopher Aurivillius in 1916. It is known from Sulawesi.

Subspecies
 Acalolepta montana floresica Breuning, 1970
 Acalolepta montana montana Aurivillius, 1916

References

Acalolepta
Beetles described in 1916